The Symphony No. 25 in C major, Hoboken I/25, is a symphony by Joseph Haydn.The symphony was most likely composed in 1763, or at the very earliest in 1761, at about the same time as No. 33.

It is scored for 2 oboes, bassoon, 2 horns, strings and continuo, and unlike most C major symphonies by Haydn lacks trumpets and timpani. The work is in three movements:

Adagio,  — Allegro molto, 
Minuetto & Trio, 
Presto, 

Unusually among Haydn's symphonies, this work lacks a slow movement, but it is partially compensated by the slow introduction.

References

Symphony 025
Compositions in C major